The Cyphellaceae are a family of fungi in the order Agaricales. The family contains 16 genera and, in 2008, 31 species.

Genera

See also
List of Agaricales families

References

 
Basidiomycota families
Taxa described in 1907
Taxa named by Johannes Paulus Lotsy